This is a list of Telugu-language films produced in Tollywood in India that are released in 2022.

Box office collection 
The list of highest-grossing Telugu films released in 2022, by worldwide box office gross revenue, are as follows:

January–March

April–June

July–September

October–December

Notes

References

External links 

2022

2022 in Indian cinema
Telugu_films_of_2022